Psithyristriini is a tribe of cicadas in the family Cicadidae, found in the Philippines. There are about 7 genera and at least 100 described species in Psithyristriini.

Genera
These seven genera belong to the tribe Psithyristriini:
 Basa Distant, 1905
 Kamalata Distant, 1889
 Onomacritus Distant, 1912
 Pomponia Stål, 1866
 Psithyristria Stål, 1870
 Semia Matsumura, 1917
 Terpnosia Distant, 1892

References

Further reading

 
 
 
 
 
 
 
 
 
 
 

  
Cicadinae
Hemiptera tribes